Yukihiro is a masculine Japanese given name.

Possible writings
Yukihiro can be written using different combinations of kanji characters. Here are some examples: 

幸弘, "happiness, vast"
幸宏, "happiness, wide"
幸浩, "happiness, wide"
幸博, "happiness, doctor"
幸広, "happiness, wide"
幸寛, "happiness, generosity"
幸大, "happiness, big"
幸裕, "happiness, abundant"
幸洋, "happiness, ocean"
行弘, "to go, vast"
行宏, "to go, wide"
行浩, "to go, wide"
行博, "to go, doctor"
行広, "to go, wide"
行寛, "to go, generosity"
行裕, "to go, abundant"
行洋, "to go, ocean"
之弘, "of, vast"
之博, "of, doctor"
之裕, "of, abundant"
之洋, "of, ocean"
志弘, "determination,  vast"
志博, "determination,  doctor"
雪弘, "snow, vast"
雪広, "snow, wide"
雪洋, "snow, ocean"
恭博, "respectful, doctor"

The name can also be written in hiragana ゆきひろ or katakana ユキヒロ.

Notable people with the name

Yukihiro Doi (土井 雪広, born 1983), Japanese cyclist
, Japanese musician better known as "Chachamaru"
 Yukihiro (musician) (born 1968), musician
, Japanese chief designer of the Ruby programming language
, Japanese swimmer
, Japanese voice actor
, Japanese scientist
, Japanese musician
, Japanese actor
, Japanese economist and writer
, Japanese professional football player

Japanese masculine given names